Giampiero Mazzi (born 14 October 1974 in Frascati) is a former Italian rugby union player and a current coach. He played as scrum-half.

Mazzi played all his career at Rugby Roma Olimpic, becoming a member of the first category in 1994/95. He played there until 2008/09. He won the titles of the Italian Championship, in 1999/2000, and the Cup of Italy in 1997/98. He became coach of the Rugby Roma Olimpic U-20 after finishing his career.

Mazzi had 5 caps for Italy, from 1998 to 1999, scoring 1 try, in an aggregate of 5 points. He was selected for the 1999 Rugby World Cup but never played.

External links

1974 births
Living people
People from Frascati
Italian rugby union players
Italian rugby union coaches
Italy international rugby union players
Rugby Roma Olimpic players
Rugby union scrum-halves
Sportspeople from the Metropolitan City of Rome Capital